Freedom of Information and Protection of Privacy Act may refer to:

 Freedom of Information and Protection of Privacy Act (Alberta)
 Freedom of Information and Protection of Privacy Act (British Columbia)
 Freedom of Information and Protection of Privacy Act (Manitoba)
 Freedom of Information and Protection of Privacy Act (Nova Scotia)
 Freedom of Information and Protection of Privacy Act (Ontario)